The Truth Is is the third studio album by English singer and songwriter Alexandra Burke. It was released on 16 March 2018 through Decca Records. Recording for the album started in 2013 and finished in early 2018. The first single from the album, "Shadow", was released on 9 February to BBC Radio 2, and to digital download and streaming on 23 February. The album entered and peaked at number 16 on the UK Albums Chart, spending only one week in the top 100. This release also returned Burke to the top 10 of Scotland's albums chart after a nine-year absence. The music style of The Truth Is has been described as a "power ballad pop" with reggae, country and soul elements.

Critical reception

The Truth Is received negative reviews from music critics. Andy Kellman from AllMusic criticised the lyrics, commenting, "The seasons, the sun, the stars, heat, fire, and assorted bodies of water ("swimming in the shallows," "almost drowned in a sea of lies") are used with such frequency that each nonmetaphorical line is a relief". Isabella Gallagher form The Arts Desk described the music style of the album as "a strange mix of 90s femme-pop that I am accidentally crushing on and cheesy musical-flavoured numbers" and added, "I would call out what the actual truth of The Truth Is - that this is music to not listen to. It's best enjoyed in the background at a low volume". Rachel Aroesti wrote in The Guardian, "the tunes are robust rather than riveting and lyrically myopic, focusing solely on the generic thrills of a nascent relationship, often, for some reason, through the prism of weather-based imagery".

Track listing

Notes
  signifies an additional producer

Charts

References

External links
 The Truth Is at Discogs (list of releases)

2018 albums
Alexandra Burke albums
Decca Records albums